Nancy Lewis is a professional female bodybuilder from the United States.  She earned her pro card by winning the overall title at the 1991 NPC USA Championship.  She competed in a number of professional contests from 1992 to 1998 with a series of solid placings, but no titles.  Then after a four-year retirement, she returned to competition in 2002, winning the overall title at the Jan Tana Classic.

Contest history 
1985 NPC Nationals - 8th (MW)
1987 NPC USA Championship - 5th (LHW)
1988 NPC California Championship - 1st (HW)
1990 NPC Nationals - 2nd (MW)
1991 NPC USA Championship - 1st (MW & Overall)
1992 Ms. International - 5th
1992 Jan Tana Classic - 2nd
1992 IFBB Ms. Olympia - 14th
1993 Jan Tana Classic - 2nd
1993 IFBB Ms. Olympia - 13th
1995 Jan Tana Classic - 3rd
1995 Grand Prix Prague - 4th
1995 IFBB Ms. Olympia - 10th
1996 IFBB Ms. Olympia - 6th
1996 Ms. International - 8th
1997 IFBB Ms. Olympia - 10th
1997 Ms. International - 8th
1998 Ms. International - 4th
2002 Jan Tana Classic - 1st (MW & Overall)
2002 IFBB Ms. Olympia - 6th (HW)
2003 Ms. International - 7th (LW)
2004 GNC Show of Strength - 1st (LW)
2004 IFBB Ms. Olympia - 4th (LW)
2009 Atlantic City Pro - 11th
2009 New York Pro Championships - 14th
2010 New York Pro Championships - 7th
2012 Tampa Pro Championships - 6th
2012 Chicago Pro Championships - 6th

References

Wennerstrom, Steve, "Flex 'n' Femme", Flex, July, 2003

Professional bodybuilders
Living people
African-American female bodybuilders
Year of birth missing (living people)
21st-century African-American people
21st-century African-American women